Club Deportivo Atlético Audaz is a sports club based in Machala, Ecuador. They are best known for their professional football team, which played in the second level of Ecuadorian football, the Serie B.

Achievements
Campeonato de Segunda
Runner-up (1): 2008

See also
Serie B de Ecuador

Atletico Audaz
Association football clubs established in 1988
1988 establishments in Ecuador